SF Minnesota (not to be confused with SF-Finn) is a nonprofit organization dedicated to speculative fiction (science fiction and fantasy, or SF) education.  Founded in February 1992 in Minneapolis/St. Paul, Minnesota, it describes itself as "a multicultural, multimedia organization. We are dedicated to improving contacts among groups and individuals interested in speculative fiction, both inside and outside of the traditional SF community. We are committed to making our state's SF community more closely reflect the cultural diversity of Minnesota in the third millennium."

Projects
SF Minnesota sponsors several projects: 
 Diversicon—an annual convention with programming exploring the diversity of humanity and the diversity of artistic expression within the realm of speculative fiction.
 Arcana- an annual convention of dark fantasy.
 Annual Classic Horror Films Party—a screening of about a half-dozen horror films with liner notes; free and open to the public.
 Speculations Reading Series at DreamHaven Books in Minneapolis—part of S.A.S.E.: The Write Place's Carol Connolly Readings.
 Gordon R. Dickson Fund for Clarion West students—SF Minnesota makes donations to this fund.
 Tales of the Unanticipated—SF Minnesota makes donations to this literary speculative fiction magazine/anthology.

Officers
2009 officers: Sybil Smith, President; Scott Lohman; and Bryan Thao Worra.

References

External links
 SF Minnesota

Science fiction fandom
Fantasy fandom
Horror fandom
Science fiction organizations